This list of hills in Schleswig-Holstein shows a selection of well-known hills in the German federal state of Schleswig-Holstein (in order of height):

Name, Height in metres above NN, Location (District/Region/Town/village)

 Bungsberg (168 m), Ostholstein district, northwest of Schönwalde
 Strezerberg (130 m), Plön district, near Giekau
 Pilsberg (128 m), Plön district, near Panker
 Voßberg (128 m), Plön district, near Kirchnüchel
 Sternberg (118 m), Plön district, near Altharmhorst, village of Kirchnüchel
 Scheelsberg (106 m), Rendsburg-Eckernförde district, west of Ascheffel, Hütten Hills
 Kleiner Hahnheider Berg (100 m), Stormarn district, Hahnheide
 Weiberberg (100 m), Ostholstein district, near Harmsdorf
 Großer Hahnheider Berg (99 m), Stormarn district, Hahnheide
 Aschberg (98 m), Rendsburg-Eckernförde district, near Ascheffel, Hütten Hills
 Kieler Berg (94m), Rendsburg-Eckernförde district, near Westensee
 Gömnitzer Berg (94 m), Ostholstein district, near Neustadt
 Haferberg (94 m), Herzogtum Lauenburg district, near Geesthacht
 Heidberg (92 m), Rendsburg-Eckernförde district, near Ascheffel, Hütten Hills
 Segeberger Kalkberg (91 m), Segeberg district, in Bad Segeberg
 Rathkrügen (89 m), Segeberg district, near Kisdorf
 Hoheneichen (89 m), Plön district, near  Rastorfer Kreuz
 Mühlenberg (88 m), Ostholstein district, near Bosau
 Tüteberg (88 m), Rendsburg-Eckernförde district, near Westensee
 Nehms-Berg (87.1 m), Segeberg district, between Bad Segeberg and Plön
 "Itzespitze" (83.4 m), Steinburg district, near Hennstedt (Steinburg)
 Grimmelsberg (83 m), Segeberg district, near Tarbek
 Mühlenberg (81 m), Herzogtum Lauenburg district, near Niendorf/ Stecknitz
 Albsfelder Berg (80 m), Herzogtum Lauenburg district, near Albsfelde
 Dellenberg (79.5 m), Steinburg district, near Hennstedt (Steinburg)
 Stilker-Berg (79.3 m), Steinburg district, near Hennstedt (Steinburg)
 Lüneburger Berg (79 m), Herzogtum Lauenburg district, near Kittlitz
 Karghöde  (78.81 m), Dithmarschen district, village of Schrum
 Heiliger Berg (78.1 m), Rendsburg-Eckernförde district, near Blumenthal
 Klingberg (78 m), Stormarn district, near Travenbrück, OT Neverstaven
 Boxberg (77 m), Rendsburg-Eckernförde district, near Homfeld
 Hohe Buch hills (76 m), Herzogtum Lauenburg district, near Groß Disnack
 Bei Rönnerheide (74.1 m), highest hill in Kiel, in the village of Rönne Kiel
 Segrahner Berg (73 m), Herzogtum Lauenburg district, near Gudow
 Ketelvierth (73m), Segeberg district near Großenaspe
 Pariner Berg (72 m), Ostholstein district, near Bad Schwartau
 Scheersberg (70 m), Schleswig-Flensburg district, near Quern
 Rolling hills of the Münsterdorf Geest Island (up to 70 m), Steinburg district, south of the Stör
 Schüberg (63 m), Stormarn district, Ammersbek OT Hoisbüttel
 Hamberg (65 m), Dithmarschen district, near Burg
 Glasberg (63.8 m), Steinburg district, north of Sarlhusen
 Bocksberg (63 m), Stormarn district, near Ahrensburg
 Reselithberg (63 m), Steinburg district, near Wacken
 Pinneberg on the island of Helgoland (61 m), Pinneberg district
 Klingeberg (59 m), Stormarn district, near Reinbek
 Lundtop (54 m), Kreis Schleswig-Flensburg, near Osterby
 Sandesberg, Nordfriesland district (53.3 m), in Ostenfeld
 Jarschenberg, Rendsburg-Eckernförde district (52.0 m), near Jahrsdorf
 Uwe-Düne on the island of Sylt (50.2 m), Nordfriesland district
 Brautberg, (49.1 m), Rendsburg-Eckernförde district, north of Bordesholm
 Lands-Berg (48.6 m), Rendsburg-Eckernförde district, near Homfeld

 Rantzauhöhe (44.8 m), Nordfriesland district, near Stadum
 Kuh-Berg (43.8 m), Steinburg district, near Sarlhusen
 Stollberg (43.4 m), Nordfriesland district
 Bunsberg (34 m), Stormarn district, near Ammersbek
 Hinrichsberg (27.2 m) highest hill on the island of Fehmarn, Ostholstein district
 Wulfener Berg (26.5 m), second highest hill auf Fehmarn, Ostholstein district
 Holmer Sandberge (23 m), Pinneberg district, near Holm

See also 
 List of the highest mountains in Germany
 List of the highest mountains in the German states
 List of mountain and hill ranges in Germany

!
Schleswig-Holstein
Schleswig-Holstein-related lists